Gandiaye Arrondissement is an arrondissement of the Kaolack Department in the Kaolack Region of Senegal.

Subdivisions
The arrondissement is divided administratively into rural communities and in turn into villages.

Arrondissements of Senegal
Kaolack Region